St. Patrick's Church is a Roman Catholic parish church in Halifax, Nova Scotia. The parish was founded in 1843 and the present church was opened in 1885. It is registered as a Provincial Heritage Building and is currently served by the Society of Jesus.

History

Foundation
In 1843, the parish of St. Patrick was founded. The first Masses were held in a local stable on the corner of Gerrish and Göttingen streets. Two years later, in 1845, the parish moved to a former chapel that was previously an Anglican Garrison Chapel.

In 1851, this was extended when a spire with a bell was added. In 1857, a school was opened in the basement of the church. In 1867 the school was moved to a separate building.

Construction
With the congregation growing in number, plans were drawn up to rebuild the church so that it would have a larger capacity. A local architect, Henry Peters, was chosen to design the church. He also designed St Matthew's Church in the city. Peters, who is buried in Holy Cross Cemetery was a well known local builder. He built the South Street Poor House, an Irish Catholic Institution in the Victoria Era. 

The last Mass in the old church was said on 2 April 1883. On 8 August 1883, the Archbishop of Halifax, Cornelius O'Brien laid the cornerstone of the new church. The first Mass in the new church was said in the basement on 22 December 1883. On 27 December 1885, the church was opened to the congregation and the first Mass was said on the main altar.

Extensions
From 1898 to 1903, stained windows were installed in the church. In 1922, those windows were replaced with ones from Franz Mayer & Co., after all but 5 of the original windows had been blown out in the December 6, 1917 Halifax explosion. That year, St Patrick's Boys School was opened opposite the church. On the same street was St Patrick's Girl School. In 1954 the schools were merged when a new school was built on Quinpool Road.

In 1946, work was carried out to repaint and maintain the church. In the 1960s and 1970s, following the Second Vatican Council, the altar rail was removed, some statues taken away and a small table altar placed before the old high altar. In 2005, the Jesuits moved into the area and started to serve as parish priests later that decade.

Parish
There is one Sunday Mass in the church, at 10:00am on Sunday morning. There are weekday Masses held in the evening at the Jesuit Centre for Spirituality next to the church.

The Saint Patrick's Band was a famous local band in Victorian Halifax. Their music was eclectic and they were in great demand.

Jesuit centre of spirituality

The Jesuit presence in Halifax started in 1940 when they were handed the administration of St Mary's College, which would become St Mary's University. The high school closed in 1963 and in 1974, the university was transferred to the Archdiocese of Halifax.

In 1952, the Jesuits founded the Canadian Martyrs' parish. In 2005, this was also transferred to the archdiocese. The Jesuits remained in the city and the following year they started the Jesuit Centre of Spirituality next to St. Patrick's church.

It is a non-residential centre for Ignatian spirituality. It offers spiritual direction, daily prayer with scripture, and the Spiritual Exercises of Ignatius of Loyola to people in Atlantic Canada.

Interior

See also
 List of Jesuit sites

References

External links

 St Patrick's Parish site
 Jesuit Centre of Spirituality site

Saint Patrick Church
Roman Catholic churches in Nova Scotia
Roman Catholic churches completed in 1885
Jesuit churches in Canada
Heritage sites in Nova Scotia
19th-century Roman Catholic church buildings in Canada